The Los Angeles Jets were an American basketball team based in Los Angeles, California, founded by Jack Blanck and Len Corbosiero, that was a member of the American Basketball League in the league's 1961–62 season.

History
The American Basketball League played one full season, 1961–1962, and part of the next season until the league folded on December 31, 1962. The ABL was the first basketball league to have a three point shot for baskets scored far away from the goal. Other rules that set the league apart were a 30-second shooting clock and a wider free throw lane, 18 feet instead of the standard 12.

The American Basketball League was formed when Abe Saperstein did not get the Los Angeles National Basketball Association (NBA) franchise he sought. His Harlem Globetrotters had strong NBA ties.  When Minneapolis Lakers owner Bob Short was permitted to move the Lakers to Los Angeles, Saperstein reacted by convincing National Alliance of Basketball Leagues (NABL) team owner Paul Cohen (Tuck Tapers) and Amateur Athletic Union (AAU) National Champion Cleveland Pipers owner George Steinbrenner to take the top NABL and AAU teams and players and form a rival league.

League franchises were: the Chicago Majors (1961-1963); Cleveland Pipers (1961-1962); Kansas City Steers (1961–63); Long Beach Chiefs (1961-1963), as Hawaii Chiefs in 1961-62; Los Angeles Jets (1961–62, disbanded during season); Oakland Oaks (1961-1963, as San Francisco Saints in 1961-1962; Philadelphia Tapers 1961-1963, as Washington Tapers in 1961-62; moved to New York during 1961-62 season; as New York Tapers in 1961-62 and the Pittsburgh Rens (1961-1963).

The team's only coach was Bill Sharman. The assistant coach was Edwin A. "Scotty" McDonald, a former Loyola (of Los Angeles) coach, and coach of many AAU teams, NBA scout, and advisor.

The team was competing for ticket buyers in a market that included the recently relocated Lakers, as well as the college teams of USC and UCLA. Partway through their first and only season, with a respectable record of 24–15, the Jets franchise found itself unable to draw enough spectators to continue. The team disbanded during its only season on January 18, 1962.

The Jets played at both the Los Angeles Memorial Sports Arena and Olympic Auditorium in Los Angeles.

Year-by-year

Game log

October
Record: 1-1 ; Home: 1-0 ; Road: 0-1

November
Record: 7-7 ; Home: 3-3; Road: 2-3; Neutral: 2-1

December
Record: 12-5 ; Home: 5-2 ; Road: 5-3 ; Neutral: 2-0

January
Record: 4-2 ; Home: 3-0 ; Road: 0-1 ; Neutral: 1-1

References

American Basketball League (1961–62) teams
Jets
Defunct basketball teams in California
Basketball teams established in 1961
Sports clubs disestablished in 1963
1961 establishments in California
1963 disestablishments in California